Starmind may refer to:

 Starmind International, software company
 Starmind (novel),  a science fiction novel by Spider Robinson and Jeanne Robinson